Trichostema rubisepalum is a species of flowering plant in the mint family known by the common name Hernandez's bluecurls.

Distribution
The plant is endemic to California. It has a disjunct distribution occurring in two main locations: the southern Diablo Range in southern San Benito County, and the western Sierra Nevada foothills, primarily within Mariposa County and Tuolumne County.

The species is a strict serpentine endemic of the Red Hills Serpentine Mass in Tuolumne County and the New Idria Serpentine Mass, Laguna Mountain Serpentine Mass, and Hepsedam Peak Serpentine Mass in southern San Benito County.  Its habitat consists of seasonally moist areas including seasonal seeps and stream and river bed edges on serpentine substrates.

Description
Its aromatic foliage is coated in long and short glandular and nonglandular hairs. The leaves are lance-shaped.

The inflorescence is a long cyme of flowers growing from the stem between each leaf pair. Each flower has a hairy calyx of pointed sepals which often take on a dark red coloration. The flower has a tubular throat and a lipped, purple corolla. The four protruding, curved stamens are about half a centimeter long.

Its bloom period is from June to July.

References

External links
Calflora Database: Trichostema rubisepalum (Hernandez bluecurls)
Jepson Manual eFlora (TJM2) treatment of Trichostema rubisepalum
California Native Plant Society Rare Plant Profile
UC Photos gallery: Trichostema rubisepalum

rubisepalum
Endemic flora of California
Flora of the Sierra Nevada (United States)
Natural history of the California chaparral and woodlands
Natural history of the California Coast Ranges
Natural history of Mariposa County, California
Natural history of San Benito County, California
Natural history of Tuolumne County, California
~
Flora without expected TNC conservation status